Pfitzneriella is a genus of moths of the family Hepialidae. There are four described species restricted to Ecuador and Peru.

Species
Pfitzneriella lucicola - Ecuador
Pfitzneriella monticola - Ecuador
Pfitzneriella remota - Peru
Pfitzneriella similis - Peru

External links
Hepialidae genera

Hepialidae
Exoporia genera
Taxa named by Pierre Viette